Unjalur Ramayamma Jeevaratnam was an Indian actress, singer, producer and playback singer. Most of her works are in Telugu and Tamil languages.

Early life
Born in Unjalur, Erode, Madras Presidency in British India to Subramaniam and Kunjammaal. She was very much interested in music right from the time of her school days and could sing very well also. K. S. Angamuthu, a very popular comedian of that time helped her to join the Krishna Drama Company at the age of 9. She had tutelage of carnatic music from Kailasa Bhagavathar and Kunnakkudi Venkatrama Iyer. She used to watch the acting style of everyone with attention.

Career
When Salem Modern Theatres was founded, she joined as an artiste. She made her debut through the Modern Theatres maiden film Sathi Ahalya in 1937 at the age of ten. She appeared as a celestial lady from the heaven. She appeared in other films till 1941 when was offered a main role in Bhaktha Gowri. She was a good singer and the song 'Theruvil varaandi' was a testimony to her mellifluous voice.

She had acted in films such as Poompavai, Abhimanyu, Bhojan and Devakanya. In the film Kannagi she had acted as Kaunthi Adigal (An old Jain nun in the Tamil epic Silapathikaram). She was awarded the title Isai Kuyil (Nightingale Of Music) by Swami Dhinakar at the 100th day function of Kannagi held at Thiruvarur. She appeared in many Modern Theatres productions.

After marriage, they started a film production company Mercury Films. The first production was Pona Machan Thirumbi Vanthaan (1954) with Sriram and T. D. Kusalakumari starring. The film earned a moderate profit. The second production was Vaazhvile Oru Naal (1956) with Sivaji Ganesan and G. Varalakshmi starring.

The third attempt was a film titled, Sirikkum Silai with MGR with the expectation of recovering the money that were lost in their previous films, but the production had to be given up within a few days of shooting. They tried a fourth attempt in the film Adichathu Yoham with Ravichandran which unfortunately had also to be shelved in the middle. They incurred heavy losses due to these two films.

She was also a playback singer. She sang for J Sushila and T N Rajalakshmi in Dewan Bahadur (1943),  T. D. Kusalakumari in Pona Machan Thirumbi Vanthaan (1954) and G. Varalakshmi in Vaazhvile Oru Naal (1956).

Personal life
She married T. S. Venkataswami who was the manager of Central Studios.  After her marriage she said bid adieu to the films but she was active in stage dramas. The couple had four daughters and one son, four granddaughters and two grandsons. Her husband died on 7 April 1971. Jeevarathnam died on 26 July 2000 when she was living at Mandaveli, Chennai. Her body was cremated at her native place Unjalur. The entire film industry paid its last respects to this veteran artiste. Her son Vetrivel and his wife Jothi Paappammaa have planned to publish a book on Jeevarathnam's biography. Jeevarathnam's family happily recalls the marriage of Vetrivel which was attended by the then chief minister MGR and V. N. Janaki. MGR handed over the sacred thaali to Vetrivel and blessed the couple.

Filmography

Actress

Playback singer

Producer
 Pona Machaan Thirumbi Vandhan (1954)
 Vaazhvile Oru Naal (1956)

References

Article on U. R. Jeevarathnam

U. R. Jeevarathnam in Tamil Wikipedia

Tamil actresses
2000 deaths
Year of birth missing
20th-century Indian actresses
People from Erode district
Actresses from Tamil Nadu